František Kreuzmann (11 October 1895 – 28 December 1960) was a Czech actor. He appeared in more than 100 films between 1927 and 1960.

Selected filmography

 Anton Spelec, Sharp-Shooter (1932)
 Pobočník Jeho Výsosti (1933)
 The Little Pet (1934)
 Long Live with Dearly Departed (1935)
 Raging Barbora (1935)
 Father Vojtech (1936)
 Virginity (1937)
 Krok do tmy (1937)
 Battalion (1937)
 The Lantern (1938)
 The Merry Wives (1938)
 A Foolish Girl (1938)
 Cesta do hlubin študákovy duše (1939)
 Muž z neznáma (1939)
 Jiný vzduch (1939)
 Second Tour (1939)
 The Magic House (1939)
 Dívka v modrém (1940)
 Ladies in Waiting (1940)
 In the Still of the Night (1941)
 Happy Journey (1943)
 Veselá bída (1944)
 The Girl from Beskydy Mountains (1944)
 Rozina, the Love Child (1945)
 The Adventurous Bachelor (1946)
 Leave It to Me (1955)
 Suburban Romance (1958)

References

External links

1895 births
1960 deaths
Actors from Plzeň
People from the Kingdom of Bohemia
20th-century Czech male actors
Czech male film actors